Abraham Moshe Hillel (1820-1920) served as Chief Rabbi of Baghdad during the years 1884, 1886–1889, and 1911–1915. He was a pupil of Rabbi Abdallah Somekh.

References 

1820 births
1920 deaths
Chief rabbis of cities
Rabbis from Baghdad
19th-century Iraqi rabbis